Amblyseius kokufuensis is a species of mite in the family Phytoseiidae.

References

kokufuensis
Articles created by Qbugbot
Animals described in 1994